Karen Pittman is an American actress. Born in Mississippi and raised in Nashville, Tennessee, Pittman received a Bachelor of Arts in Voice and Opera at Northwestern University and a Masters of Fine Arts from NYU's Graduate Acting Program. Pittman has portrayed the character of Jory in the 2012 Lincoln Center production of Disgraced and has performed in FX Network's The Americans and Netflix's Luke Cage, as Lisa and Inspector Priscilla Ridley, respectively.

Since 2019, she has starred as Mia Jordan in the Apple TV+ drama series The Morning Show for which she was nominated for a SAG award, along with the cast in 2022.

Filmography

Film

Television

Theater

References

External links

Living people
American television actresses
African-American actresses
American stage actresses
American film actresses
Northwestern University alumni
New York University alumni
Actresses from Mississippi
Actresses from Nashville, Tennessee
21st-century American actresses
Theatre World Award winners
21st-century African-American women
21st-century African-American people
Year of birth missing (living people)